Mohammad Rameez (born 19 February 1990) is a Pakistani first-class cricketer who played for Rawalpindi cricket team.

References

External links
 

1990 births
Living people
Pakistani cricketers
Attock Group cricketers
Rawalpindi cricketers
Cricketers from Rawalpindi
South Asian Games bronze medalists for Pakistan
South Asian Games medalists in cricket